Arignar Anna Institute of Science and Technology is a College of Engineering that is located in Sriperumbudur, Chennai, Tamil Nadu. It was established in 1999. The college has been approved by the All India Council for Technical Education (AICTE) and linked to University of Madras.

Location
The college with 2.5 Lakh Sq.ft. of built up area is situated at Chennai (Sriperumbudur) in 60 acres of green land surrounded by Hyundai Ltd., Dell, Samsung, MRF, Nokia, Flextronix, Motorola, Arjun Technologies, Inzi Controls, etc.

References

External links
 

Engineering colleges in Chennai